Lu Kang may refer to:

 Lu Kang (Han dynasty) (陸康), an official in the late Eastern Han Dynasty.
 Lu Kang (Eastern Wu) (陸抗), a general and politician in the state of Eastern Wu during the Three Kingdoms period.
 Lu Kang (diplomat) (born 1968), Chinese diplomat